Otto Barch (born 20 December 1943, in Frunze) is a retired race walker who represented the USSR. He competed at the 1968, 1972 and 1976 Summer Olympics. Barch was affiliated with Burevestnik Frunze.

His greatest achievement was placing second in the 50 km race at the 1973 World Race Walking Cup.

References

External links

1943 births
Living people
Sportspeople from Bishkek
Kyrgyzstani racewalkers
Kyrgyzstani male athletes
Soviet male racewalkers
Athletes (track and field) at the 1968 Summer Olympics
Athletes (track and field) at the 1972 Summer Olympics
Athletes (track and field) at the 1976 Summer Olympics
Olympic athletes of the Soviet Union
Burevestnik (sports society) athletes